Neelam Kaur Gill (born 27 April 1995) is an Indian-British fashion model. She has worked with Burberry, Abercrombie & Fitch and appeared in Vogue.

Personal life
Gill was born in Coventry, West Midlands, England on 27 April, 1995 and resides in London as of 2014. Her grandparents were born in India and are Sikhs from the Indian state of Punjab. Gill has spoken about bullying, depression and body confidence issues via her YouTube channel and also said that she "feels sorry" for online trolls.

Career
At the age of fourteen she signed with NEXT Model Management. She has appeared in Vogue India. In September 2013, Gill made her debut on the catwalk for Burberry’s fashion show during London Fashion Week. In 2014, Gill became the first Indian model featured in a Burberry campaign. In November 2015, she became the face of Abercrombie & Fitch. Gill has walked for Kanye West's Fashion Week Show and Dior.

References

External links

British Sikhs
British people of Indian descent
Living people
1995 births
British female models